The Pine Island City Hall and Fire Station, at Main and 3rd Streets in Pine Island, Minnesota, also known as the Pine Island City Hall, was built in 1909.  It was listed on the National Register of Historic Places in 1980.

It was deemed significant as a government building representative of the multipurpose municipal facilities commonly built in southeastern Minnesota in the late 19th and early 20th centuries.

It is a two-story  plan building of orange-yellow brick.  It has round-arched doorways, with double doors.  It has gargoyles.

Not only did the building include "a large hall, jail, fire station, and council chambers under one roof, but with its massive scale and flamboyant tower, it also served as a statement of strong civic pride."

References

City and town halls in Minnesota
Jails in Minnesota
Fire stations on the National Register of Historic Places in Minnesota
National Register of Historic Places in Goodhue County, Minnesota
Romanesque Revival architecture in Minnesota
Fire stations completed in 1909